A special election was held in  on May 23, 1814 to fill a vacancy left by the resignation of William M. Richardson (DR) on April 18, 1814.

Election returns

Dana took his seat September 22, 1814.  His opponent in this election would go on to defeat him in the general elections later that year.

See also
List of special elections to the United States House of Representatives

References

United States House of Representatives 1814 04
Massachusetts 1814 04
1814 04
Massachusetts 1814 04
Massachusetts 04
United States House of Representatives 04